Game Network was a European free-to-air television channel. It was initially owned by Digital Bros group, and later taken over by Cellcast Group. It was first launched in 1999.

History
Game Network first broadcast in Italy on 17 September 1999. The channel was available all over Southern Europe, and developed an estimated audience of 300,000. It launched in the United Kingdom on May 2001 on Sky EPG number 223. At its UK launch, the Financial Times evaluated the channel's free-to-air business proposition, commenting that its potential viewers should be abundant with consideration to the surge of popularity of video games at the time, inline with the release of hundreds of titles in the UK each year and the launch of the PlayStation 2 months earlier. The channel was expected to provide 24-hour television dedicated to video games and earn money from advertising and sponsorship.

The UK version of the television channel (produced by Cellcast) overlayed their own regional content to the channel, with programs including Digital Crack, Me in Mir, The Weekly Chart Show, Game Guru, Reloaded, LiveWire, Evolution. The channel expanded in 2003 (the year Cellcast started increasing control of the channel, with Sem Mioli of Digital Bros. side and Jonathan French and Craig Gardiner from the Cellcast side spearheading the channel) with the launch of non-gaming programmes such as Babestation, a late-night "tease" show. The success of this show lead to many other clone programmes appearing on other channels, and this alternative revenue stream lead to a later influx of phone-in quiz shows, of which Game Network shows many. By 2005, Game Network's UK games programming went largely limited to a block of raw games footage from 5:30 am – 10am (under the name Game Clip), with Game Guru airing from 5 pm until 7 pm, followed by programmes such as Psychic Interactive, which continue until Babestation starts.

In 2004, the channel's Sky EPG number was 172.

The major gaming shows, such as LiveWire, were cancelled in May 2005, and the Italian-language feed from Hot Bird ceased on September 17, 2005, after six years on air. At this time, Digital Bros. sold Game Network UK completely to Cellcast Group, which completely dropped all video game content by 20 February 2006 and renamed it Babestation. On 28 February, the channel was moved to the adult section of the Sky EPG.

Online games 
During the time in which Game Network ran as a television channel, they also hosted servers for various online games including Horizons Online, Droiyan Online, The Legend of Mir series, and Myth of Soma, some of which also prominently advertised on their programming (The Legend of Mir games also received their own dedicated programmes). After Game Network ceased to exist as a television channel, their online side involving the video games that they provided to the public continued as GNOnline until servers for The Legend of Mir 2, The Legend of Mir 3, and Myth of Soma were closed on March 2009.

Shows
 Digital Crack (April 2001 – September 2001): A magazine format show with chat, game play and news between the 3 presenters Carl, Bettina Perrie and Alison. The show was fast-paced with reviews, game battles and email requests and replies.  The three presenters were very popular and had a great on screen chemistry.
 Me in Mir: A comedy show where Carl would get dressed up, sing songs and chat to players live in Legend of Mir. 
 Game Guru (December 2001 – February 2006): A live daily phone-in video gaming show originally presented by one "guru" presenter via webcam. After October 2003 (Series 2) the format changed to two presenters, one working on Phone Calls while presenting on camera, while the other worked on Texts (the secondary presenter often could be heard in many episodes). Members of the public would ring or text in and ask for cheats or walkthroughs to various video games, after which the Gurus would explain how and/or post up the solution on television via a chatroom like text program. Viewers could also ask for game release dates, opinions on what game/console to buy next or for news about the gaming industry.
 Livewire (November 2004 – June 2005): A live Saturday news, reviews and previews show, presented by Gareth Williams, Mike Rushton, Chris Jeffery and, in later shows, Stuart Headlam. Often with a special guest from the gaming industry. The show once even had a special guest appearance from Goldie Lookin Chain.
 Reloaded (January – June 2005, November 2005 – February 2006): A show (originally daily, then airing only on Saturdays) where the Game Gurus would challenge the public to bouts of various games online. The show would often be presented by a random presenter. The Game Gurus usually played games like Halo 2, Rainbow Six 3: Black Arrow and Project Gotham Racing 2 via Xbox Live using gamertags GameGuruUk and GameGuruUK2. From the second series (lasting from November 2005 to February 2006), Reloaded also incorporated the features of Livewire, which did not return due to copyright reasons with the name.
 Evolution (September 2005 – February 2006): One of Game Network's only pre-recorded shows. The concept was quite bizarre, originally meant to be presented from DJ NES's (Daniel Scammel) and Peter Browning's (the producer of Game Network) flat. It consisted of news, reviews, interviews and previews presented by a naked man in a towel, a guy who called himself "Duck Recon", and Game Guru's "Guru Larry" (Larry Bundy Jr) streaming video over a PC monitor. The show moved direction to be presented in the usual Game Network studio (grey sofa, large plasma TV in the background), and then into a more information based show with the main screen in a window, with information, text, release dates etc. filling the rest of the screen.

Incomplete and unaired shows
 7 Days in LA: A short lived documentary based on the 2005 E3 show. 3 show regulars (Mike Rushton, Chris Jeffery and Dom Lawler) along with 2 randoms (Scott Doherty and Ryan Hadley) took part in this observational documentary that not only focused on the goings on of the exhibition but also the behind the scenes action. Due to the cancellation of Game Guru in early June 2005, only 4 of the 12 episodes aired, though many of the later episodes did eventually appear on various websites.
 Guru Larry's Hack Job: An all out comedy show involving "Guru Larry" Bundy Jr. presenting the show with his own bizarre and funny twist on the industry, often making fun of people in the games industry such as Jack Thompson. Although a series was made, it never made it to air because of the cancellation of the channel. Bundy retained all rights to his contributions to Game Network, and has slowly released those segments through his personal YouTube channel.

Video clips
  Video highlights from Reloaded's Xbox 360 launch special
  Additional highlights from the Reloaded Xbox 360 launch special
  Reloaded's Game Guru Vs. Friendly TV's Gamerweb special
  Reloaded's ident/testcard "ITV Schools" spoof screen

References

External links
 Game Network Italia
 Game Media Network

Cellcast
Television channels in the United Kingdom
Television shows about video games
Defunct television channels in the United Kingdom
Video gaming in the United Kingdom
Television channels and stations established in 1999
Television channels and stations disestablished in 2006
Television channels in Italy